In Greek mythology, Chromia (Ancient Greek: , Khrōmía) was the daughter of Itonus, son of Amphictyon, himself son of Deucalion. She was also, in some traditions, the mother of Aetolus, Paeon, Epeius and Eurycyda by Endymion.

The poem Endymion, a Tale of Greece, by Henry B. Hirst (1848) is a modern retelling of the legend of Endymion and Chromia.

Notes

Princesses in Greek mythology

References 

 Pausanias, Description of Greece with an English Translation by W.H.S. Jones, Litt.D., and H.A. Ormerod, M.A., in 4 Volumes. Cambridge, MA, Harvard University Press; London, William Heinemann Ltd. 1918. . Online version at the Perseus Digital Library
 Pausanias, Graeciae Descriptio. 3 vols. Leipzig, Teubner. 1903.  Greek text available at the Perseus Digital Library.

Boeotian characters in Greek mythology
Boeotian mythology